The Cheroenhaka (Nottoway) Indian Tribe is a state-recognized tribe and nonprofit organization in Virginia. The organization identifies as descending from Nottoway people. They are not federally recognized as a Native American tribe.

The name Cheroenhaka is the autonym for Nottoway people.

State-recognition 

The Commonwealth of Virginia recognized the Cheroenhaka (Nottoway) Indian Tribe as a tribe in 2010, when the state also recognized the Nottoway Indian Tribe of Virginia.

Organization 
The group formed Cheroenhaka (Nottoway) Indian Tribal Heritage Foundation, a 501(c)(3) nonprofit organization in 2005, with the mission to "Educational, charitable and religious. Educational, charitable, and religious." In 2020, the nonprofit held $468,180 in assets and hiring no employees.

The chief is Walter "Red Halk" Brown of Courtland, Virginia.

Notes

External links
 

Cultural organizations based in Virginia
Non-profit organizations based in Virginia
2005 establishments in Virginia
State-recognized tribes in the United States